Nenunnanu is a 2004 Indian Telugu-language romantic drama film produced by D.Sivaprasad Reddy on Kamakshi Movies banner, directed by V. N. Aditya. The film had Nagarjuna Akkineni, Aarthi Agarwal and Shriya Saran in the starring roles with Mukesh Rishi and Subbaraju in supporting roles and music by M. M. Keeravani.

Plot 
Venu is an orphan and a contractor at Vizag port. Anu is a student in classical singing. Sruthi is Anu's friend. Anu makes an attempt to elope with her boyfriend Arun. Arun is the son of business tycoon JP. JP sends police across to nab Anu. As police nab Arun, Venu rescues Anu. Anu's father disassociates himself from his daughter. Then Venu takes Anu to his place and gives assurance. Venu finds out where Arun is and gets Anu married to him. JP tells his son that Venu and Anu have an affair as they live together in the same house. Arun gets suspicious about Anu's character and leaves the marriage venue immediately after the marriage. Anu is back in Venu's place. Venu is in the mission of locating Arun and convince him to come back to Anu. As Anu and Venu spend more time together, they get closer. Venu never takes advantage of it and treats Anu like a good friend. Anu pines for Arun but learns that Arun will marry the Minister's daughter. Venu goes to the engagement venue and tries to stop Arun from getting engaged. Anu comes and slaps Arun, saying that their marriage is over. She goes for a singing competition with Venu accompanying her. She wins the competition as well as her father's love. Arun, meanwhile tries to kill Venu but accidentally gets an electric shock. He gets paralysed for life. JP seeks revenge. Sruthi falls for Venu. Anu goes back to her father's house and now, being unmarried, thinks over her relationship with Venu. She realises that she loves Venu. Venu, too, reveals among his friends that he loves Anu, but will never tell her. Sruthi overhears both Anu and Venu's feelings and decides to sacrifice her love for Venu. Her parents decide to get her married to Venu. Sruthi refuses to marry Venu and tells them everything. Sruthi's mother gets angry and asks Anu to arrange her daughter's and Venu's wedding. Anu gets heartbroken but thinks that it's better for everyone. Sruthi goes to Venu and tells him that Anu, too, loves him. Anu is kidnapped by JP and his goons.

Venu goes to save Anu. After a big fight, he is able to defeat JP and save Anu, but Anu is stabbed. Sruthi comes and she takes Anu to the hospital. Venu comes to the hospital later. Anu asks the doctors to allow her to meet Venu before treating her. Anu and Venu confess their love for each other. Anu is successfully operated upon and finally united with Venu, with everyone's, including Sruthi's mother's, wishes. Then Venu marries Anu and lives happily ever after.

Cast

 Nagarjuna Akkineni as Venu Madhav "Venu"
 Shriya Saran as Anu
 Aarthi Agarwal as Sruthi
 Anita Hassanandani (special appearance)
 Mukesh Rishi as JP
 Subbaraju as Arun
 Brahmanandam as Manmadha Rao
 Sunil as Tip Sundaram
 Ali as Kamal Hassan 
 Tanikella Bharani as Simhachalam Naidu
 Paruchuri Venkateswara Rao as Sruthi's father
 Sudha as Annu's mother
 Siva Parvathi as Sruthi's mother
 Dharmavarapu Subramanyam as Music School Principal 
 Ravi Babu as Walter Ravi 
 Siva Reddy as Venu's friend
 Pasupathy as JP's henchman
 M. S. Narayana
 Jenny
 Kaushal Manda
 Ananth
 Hema Sundar 
 Naidu Gopi
 Neharika 
 Likhitha Yamini 
 Swathi 
 Deepthi 
 Dolly 
 Master Anand Vardhan as Young Venu 
 Baby Sri Vibha as Young Sruthi
 Baby Nishiptha as Young Anu

Soundtrack

The music was composed by M. M. Keeravani. Music was released on ADITYA Music Company.

Reception
Jeevi of Idlebrain wrote that "The plus points of the film are Nagarjuna and music by Keeravani. The main drawback of the film is incoherent script and loose screenplay". Sify opined that "But at the end of Nenuannu the audience leave whining evanu unnaru". Mithun Verma of Full Hyderabad wrote that "Nenunnanu is completely a commercial venture - violence and songs for the masses; sentiment and emotion for the ladies; romance for the youth; comedy for the kids; The only element missing is a magic wand to make all of the above look jointed rather than disjointed".

Box-office performance
 The film collected 14 crores and had a 50-day run in 125 centres and a 100-day run in 42 centres. It was one of the highest grossers in Nagarjuna's career while major business was from A centers

References

External links
 

2004 films
Films scored by M. M. Keeravani
Indian romantic drama films
2000s Telugu-language films
2004 romantic drama films